Hallock Township is located in Peoria County, Illinois, United States. As of the 2010 census, its population was 1,600 and it contained 619 housing units.  The current supervisor Kevin Peterson has served in this position since 1994.

Geography

Demographics

References

External links
City-data.com
Illinois State Archives

Townships in Peoria County, Illinois
Peoria metropolitan area, Illinois
Townships in Illinois